The Last Metro is a 1980 historical drama film, written and directed by François Truffaut, that stars Catherine Deneuve and Gérard Depardieu.

Opening in 1942 during the German occupation of France, it follows the fortunes of a small theatre in the Montmartre area of Paris which keeps up passive resistance by maintaining its cultural integrity, despite censorship, antisemitism and material shortages, to emerge triumphant at the war's end.  
The title evokes two salient facts of city life under the Germans: fuel shortages led people to spend their evenings in theatres and other places of entertainment, but the curfew meant they had to catch the last Métro train home.

In 1981, the film won 10 Césars for: best film, best actor (Depardieu), best actress (Deneuve), best cinematography, best director (Truffaut), best editing, best music, best production design, best sound and best writing. It received Best Foreign Film nominations in the Academy Awards and Golden Globe Awards.

The Last Metro was one of Truffaut's more successful productions, grossing $3,007,436 in the United States; this was also true in France, where it had 3,384,045 admissions, making it one of his more successful films in his native country.

Plot
On his way to start rehearsals at the Théâtre Montmartre, where he has been hired as male lead for a new production, young Bernard Granger is repeatedly rebuffed by a woman he is trying to pick up in the street. When he arrives, she turns out to be the production designer Arlette, a lesbian. He is taken to see former starlet Marion, who is both owner of the theatre and leading lady. Her Jewish husband, Lucas, is the director of the theater believed to have left Paris but is in fact living in the cellar, from where Marion releases him each evening while delivering food and prospective materials for future productions. Their evenings are spent in the empty theatre making love and discussing the current production alongside plans for Lucas to flee the country. Marion is immediately smitten with the oblivious Bernard, whom Lucas only knows from a headshot and what he can hear through a rigged heating vent. Unknown to anybody at the theatre, Bernard is a member of a Resistance group and delivers the bomb that kills a German admiral.

The first night is loved by a full house but one of the newspaper reviews next morning is viciously hostile, damning the show as Jewish. The writer, Daxiat, an anti-semite, hopes to oust Marion and take over her theatre. While cast and crew are celebrating their success in a nightclub, Daxiat is also there with another party. Bernard, furious that the man has insulted the gentile Marion, hustles him out to the street and pushes him around. Furious that Bernard has jeopardised her theatre, Marion refuses all contact with him offstage. One night, pretending to be air raid wardens, two Gestapo men start searching the theatre and it is Bernard to whom Marion turns in desperation for urgent help in concealing Lucas and his effects. When the Gestapo arrest Bernard's Resistance contact just before they have planned to meet in a church, he decides to devote his life to the cause and give up acting. As he is clearing out his little dressing room, Marion comes in to say goodbye and the two make love on the floor.

After the war, Bernard returns to be male lead in a new play that the freed Lucas wrote while hiding. In it, the female lead played by Marion offers to share her life but he claims he never really loved her. At the end of the opening night, Bernard, Marion and Lucas stand hand in hand to receive the applause.

Cast 

 Catherine Deneuve as Marion Steiner
 Gérard Depardieu as Bernard Granger
 Jean Poiret as Jean-Loup Cottins
 Heinz Bennent as Lucas Steiner
 Andréa Ferréol as Arlette Guillaume, the production designer
 Paulette Dubost as Germaine Fabre, the older woman employed by the theatre
 Sabine Haudepin as Nadine Marsac, the young actress
 Jean-Louis Richard as Daxiat
 Maurice Risch as Raymond Boursier, the technician of the theatre
 Marcel Berbert as Merlin
 Richard Bohringer as a Gestapo Officer
 László Szabó as Lieutenant Bergen
 Jean-Pierre Klein as Christian Leglise, a resistant
 Franck Pasquier as Jacquot/Eric
 Rose Thierry as Jacquot's mother
 Martine Simonet as Martine Sénéchal
 Christian Baltauss as the actor replacing Bernard
 Rénata as Greta Borg, a singer in a club
 Hénia Ziv as Yvonne
 Jean-José Richer as René Bernardini
 Jessica Zucman as Rosette
 René Dupré as M. Valentin
 Alain Tasma as Marc
 Pierre Belot as the Hotel porter
 Jacob Weizbluth as Rosen

Production
Truffaut had wanted to create a film set during the French occupation period for a long time, as his uncle and grandfather were both part of the French Resistance, and were once caught while passing messages. This event was eventually recreated in The Last Metro.
Truffaut was inspired by the actor Jean Marais’s autobiography, basing the film on this and other documents by theatre people from during the occupation.

This film was one installment - dealing with theatre - of a trilogy on the entertainment world envisaged by Truffaut. The installment that dealt with the film world was 1973's La Nuit Américaine (Day for Night), which had won the Academy Award for Best Foreign Language Film. Truffaut completed the screenplay for the third installment, L'Agence Magique, which would have dealt with the world of music hall. In the late 1970s, he was close to beginning filming, but the failure of his film The Green Room forced him to look to a more commercial project, and he filmed Love on the Run instead.

Truffaut began casting in September 1979, and wrote the role of Marion especially with Catherine Deneuve in mind, for her energy.
Gérard Depardieu initially did not want to be involved in the film, as he did not like Truffaut’s directing style, but he was subsequently convinced that he should take part.

Most of the filming took place in an abandoned chocolate factory on Rue du Landy in Clichy, which was converted into a studio. During shooting Deneuve suffered an ankle sprain from a fall, resulting in having to shoot scenes at short notice. Scriptwriter Suzanne Schiffman was also hospitalised with a serious intestinal obstruction.
The film shoot lasted fifty-nine days and ended on 21 April 1980.

Themes
A recurring theme in Truffaut’s films has been linking film-making and film-watching. The Last Metro is self-conscious in this respect. In the opening the film mixes documentary footage with period re-creations alongside shots of contemporary film posters.

Truffaut commented: “this film is not concerned merely with anti-semitism but intolerance in general” and a tolerance is shown through the characters of Jean Poiret playing a homosexual director and Andrea Ferreol plays a lesbian designer.

As in Truffaut's earlier films Jules et Jim and Two English Girls, there is a love triangle between the three principal characters: Marion Steiner (Deneuve), her husband Lucas (Heinz Bennent) and Bernard Granger (Depardieu), an actor in the theatre's latest production.

Reception
The film recorded admissions in France of 3,384,045.

Awards and nominations
Academy Awards (USA)
Nominated: Best Foreign Language Film
National Board of Review (USA)
Nominated: Best Foreign Language Film
Boston Film Critics (USA)
Won: Best Foreign Language Film
César Awards (France)
Won: Best Actor – Leading Role (Gérard Depardieu)
Won: Best Actress – Leading Role (Catherine Deneuve)
Won: Best Cinematography (Néstor Almendros)
Won: Best Director (François Truffaut)
Won: Best Editing (Martine Barraqué)
Won: Best Film
Won: Best Music (Georges Delerue)
Won: Best Production Design (Jean-Pierre Kohut-Svelko)
Won: Best Sound (Michel Laurent)
Won: Best Writing (Suzanne Schiffman and François Truffaut)
Nominated: Best Actor – Supporting Role (Heinz Bennent)
Nominated: Best Actress – Supporting Role (Andréa Ferréol)
David di Donatello Awards (Italy)
Won: Best Foreign Actress (Catherine Deneuve)
Golden Globe Awards (USA)
Nominated: Best Foreign Film

See also
 List of submissions to the 53rd Academy Awards for Best Foreign Language Film
 List of French submissions for the Academy Award for Best Foreign Language Film

References

External links
 
 
 
 Ulrich Bach: The Visual Representation of the German Occupation in France: François Truffaut's The Last Metro (1980) 
Truffaut’s Changing Times: The Last Metro an essay by Armond White at the Criterion Collection

1980 films
1980s war drama films
French war drama films
1980s French-language films
1980s German-language films
Films directed by François Truffaut
Films about the French Resistance
Best Film César Award winners
Films whose director won the Best Director César Award
Films featuring a Best Actor César Award-winning performance
Films featuring a Best Actress César Award-winning performance
Adultery in films
Films set in a theatre
Films about theatre
Films with screenplays by François Truffaut
Films scored by Georges Delerue
1980 drama films
1980s French films